Candidia is a genus of small cyprinid freshwater fish endemic to Taiwan.

Species
There are currently two recognized species in this genus.

 Candidia barbata (Regan, 1908)
 Candidia pingtungensis I. S. Chen, J. H. Wu & C. H. Hsu, 2008

References

Cyprinid fish of Asia
Cyprinidae genera
Fish of Taiwan
Taxa named by David Starr Jordan